We Were Here is a franchise of cooperative first-person adventure video games, created by the Dutch studio Total Mayhem Games.

Premise and gameplay
The We Were Here games are cooperative first-person adventure games with puzzle elements. In each game there are two players who take on a different role. They must work together to solve puzzles, generally while in different rooms and unable to see the other. Each player has a walkie-talkie to communicate with the other, which is what allows them to solve the puzzles they face.

History

The first We Were Here was developed by Dutch studio Total Mayhem Games as part of a student project while studying at the Rotterdam University of Applied Sciences. It was a student entrant for the Independent Games Festival 2018, and won the Best Indie Game Award in 2017 at the Indigo showcase in the Netherlands. It was released for free on Steam in February 2017.

The original We Were Here was first released on PC on February 3, 2017, with the sequel We Were Here Too releasing on February 2, 2018. An Xbox One version of We Were Here released in September 2019, and We Were Here Too for Xbox One was released on October 2 the same year. The third game We Were Here Together was released on PC on October 10, 2019, and Xbox One on June 5, 2020.

All three games were released on PlayStation 4 on February 23, 2021. We Were Here was released as a free to download on PlayStation Store from February 9 until February 22, as part of the release date announcement.

We Were Here (2017)
We Were Here is a cooperative first-person puzzle video game developed by Total Mayhem Games from The Netherlands, released for free on February 3, 2017, on Steam for PC. Two players take the role of Antarctic explorers who have become split up in an old castle, called Castle Rock. They must solve puzzles by communicating via walkie-talkies. It was released on Xbox One on September 16, 2019, and was featured in Xbox Games with Gold.

We Were Here Too (2018)
We Were Here Too was the first commercial release by Total Mayhem Games. The gameplay is similar to the original We Were Here, with two players who are split up and must solve puzzles by communicating via walkie-talkie. The game was released on February 2, 2018, on Steam for PC, and on October 2, 2019, for Xbox One.

We Were Here Together (2019)
We Were Here Together was released on October 10, 2019, on Steam for PC, and on June 5, 2020, for Xbox One. In a twist on the series' usual gameplay, players spend some of the game in the same area together, where they can both visit the same locations. There are new locations including the base camp where their expedition began, ice caves, and Antarctic outdoors. Working together is still required to progress.

We Were Here Forever (2022)
We Were Here Forever was announced for PC, PlayStation 4 + 5, and Xbox One + Series X|S. It was released on May 10, 2022 for PC only, on Steam and the Epic Games Store. The console versions for Xbox and PlayStation were released on January 31, 2023, and included a crossplay update for the PC version, allowing players from all three platforms to play together. We Were Here Forever was the first game in the series to support crossplay.  The game has new areas, puzzles, and an improved interface.

Reception

In their review of We Were Here Too, Adventure Gamers described the first game as noble, saying that "though bite-sized, it offered a neat concept and was well received".

We Were Here Too received "mixed or average" reviews, with outlets largely praising the puzzles and core gameplay, but noting that the game was fairly short. Adventure Gamers found that "solving puzzles co-operatively is very satisfying", but criticized the game for being short and lacking detailed story. Vgames praised the puzzles and atmosphere, but also found it short and lacking replay value. PLAY! Zine described the puzzles and communication gameplay as strong points, but criticized the story and some technical issues.

We Were Here Together received "mixed or average" reviews for console and "generally positive" reviews for PC. The puzzles and core gameplay were well received, and critics appreciated the game being longer than its predecessors. However, the narrative part of the game was largely seen as underwhelming or distracting. Adventure Gamers praised the puzzles and communication gameplay, while encountering some technical issues and finding the story unclear. Game Watcher described it as 'a must-play for fans of both co-op adventures and challenging puzzles', while also noting some technical issues. Games.cz called it 'by far, the best installment of the whole series' but criticised its story as weak.

We Were Here Forever received "generally favorable" reviews, with critics praising its tight co-op design while criticizing its sometimes unbalanced puzzle design.

References

External links
 

Asymmetrical multiplayer video games
Cooperative video games
First-person video games
PlayStation 4 games
Puzzle video games
Video game franchises
Video games developed in the Netherlands
Windows games
Xbox One games